Kazi Ahmed also Qazi Ahmed, is a town in Shaheed Benazir Abad District (formerly Nawabshah), Sindh province, Pakistan. The town lies on the National Highway between Moro and Sakrand cities. After the construction of Amri Bridge, Kazi Ahmed has become a commercial hub for locals.  

The town is named after Qazi Ahmad Dimmai (Qudus Sarhu), an 18th-century Sufi saint who settled in the area and whose shrine is in the town as well.

Geography

Summertime highs might be as high as 51 degrees Celsius. Additionally, a variety of crops are grown in the agricultural territory that surrounds the town. Sugarcane, wheat, rice, and cotton are some of these crops.

Transportation
 N-5 National Highway (kilometre marker 275).
 Nawabshah to Kazi Ahmed Road.
 Qazi Ahmed to Daur
 Qazi Ahmed to lakhat
 Qazi Ahmed to Aamri Bridge

References

Towns in Pakistan
Populated places in Shaheed Benazir Abad District